"Too Late, Too Late" is the debut single by British band Mr Hudson and the Library, from their debut album A Tale of Two Cities. It features brass by the Blackjack Horns, Nik Carter on sax, Jack Birchwood on trumpet and Steven Fuller on trombone.

It was featured in the film Mr. Bean's Holiday.

Track listing
UK CD single

"Too Late, Too Late" - 3:09
"Bread + Roses" - 3:34

Chart positions

References

2007 songs
2007 debut singles
Mr Hudson songs
Songs written by Mr Hudson
Universal Records singles